Sop, a piece of bread soaked in a liquid, or the verb associated with soaking bread in liquid.

SOP or sop may also refer to:

Places
 Sop (West Papua), an island in Indonesian Papua
 Moore County Airport (North Carolina) (IATA code: SOP)
  Sop town

Arts, entertainment, and media
 SOP (variety show) in the Philippines
 Sons of the Patriots, a network in Metal Gear Solid 4: Guns of the Patriots

Computing
 Same-origin policy, a security measure
 SCSI over PCI Express
 Service-oriented programming
 Service-oriented provisioning

Process and planning
 Sales and operations planning, S&OP
 Standard operating procedure

Science, medicine, technology
 SOP (IRC), Super Operator
 Sensory organ precursor, for example in the NUMB gene
 Small outline package IC
 State of polarization in physics, for example 
 Structure–organization–process
 Sulphate of potash (potassium sulfate)
 Sum of products

Other uses
 Sop language, spoken in Papua New Guinea
 Statement of purpose

See also
 Sour sop, or soursop